Paul Vincent Priolo  (July 14, 1927 – July 22, 2018) served in the California State Assembly for the 60th and 38th district from 1967 to 1980. During World War II he served in the United States Navy.

He sponsored the Alquist Priolo Special Studies Zone Act passed in 1972.

References

United States Navy personnel of World War II
Members of the California State Assembly
1927 births
2018 deaths